Hamit Şare (born February 19, 1982 in Bursa, Turkey) is an Olympic alpine skier discipline.

Hamit began skiing at five years of age. He joined the Turkish national ski team already in 1993. He won seven national titles, represented Turkey 79 times, and finished in the top 50 in the 2005 World Championships. He is currently a student in the Faculty of Sports at the Uludağ University in Bursa.

From the quota given to Turkey by the Olympic Committee, he was selected to be sent to the 2006 Winter Olympics among his four other teammates.

Achievements
 2005
 World Championships, Bormio, Italy
 Slalom:  44th
 Giant slalom: 55th

References
 Turkey National Olympic Committee official website (in Turkish)
 Biography at Visa Europe website

1982 births
Living people
Turkish male alpine skiers
Alpine skiers at the 2006 Winter Olympics
Olympic alpine skiers of Turkey
Sportspeople from Bursa
21st-century Turkish people